The 2015–16 Macedonian First League was the 24th season of the Macedonian First League, with 8 teams participating in it.

Regular season started on October 10, 2015, and finished on April 23, 2016, followed by the playoffs, with the six best placed teams joining it.

Teams

Personnel and sponsorship

Coaching changes

Regular season

Standings

Playoffs
In quarterfinals, if one of the teams won the two regular season games against its rival, a first win is awarded in the best-of-five series.

Individual statistics

Points

Rebounds

Assists

Steals

Blocks

MVP List

MVP of the Round

Macedonian clubs in European competitions

References

External links
 Macedonian Basketball website
 Macedonian First League at Eurobasket.com

Macedonian First League (basketball) seasons
Macedonian
Basketball